Andreas Aalen Vindheim (born 4 August 1995) is a Norwegian professional footballer who plays as a right-back for Lillestrøm on loan from Sparta Prague.

Club career

Brann
Vindheim was born in Bergen, He started his career at local club Brann and made cup appearances in 2012 and 2013. Vindheim made his league debut for Brann on 4 May 2014 against Start, the game ended 1–1. In total he played 22 league matches for the 2014 season when Brann was relegated from Tippeligaen.

Malmö FF
On 11 March 2015, Vindheim signed a four-year contract with Swedish champions Malmö FF. He became the third Norwegian player to sign for the club during the 2015 pre-season. In his first three seasons he acted mainly as a back-up for Anton Tinnerholm but when he left after the 2017 season he started to become a regular in the first team. When new manager Uwe Rösler took over Malmö changed to a 3-5-2 formation and Vindheim began playing as a right wing-back. 

He played all ten games in Malmö FF's 2018–19 Europa League campaign and scored the first goal in a 2–0 win against Besiktas in the group stage.

Sparta Prague
On 21 May 2019, Vindheim signed for AC Sparta Prague for a reported fee of €1.2 million.

Schalke 04
On 10 January 2022, Vindheim agreed to join Schalke 04 on loan until the end of the 2021–22 season with an option to make the move permanent.

Lillestrøm
On 21 February 2023, Vindheim agreed to join Lillestrøm on loan until the end of the 2022–23 season with an option to make the move permanent.

Personal life
Andreas Vindheim is the son of former Brann, Sogndal and Burnley midfielder Rune Vindheim.

Career statistics

Club

Honours

Malmö FF
 Allsvenskan: 2016, 2017

Sparta Prague
 Czech Cup: 2019–20

Schalke 04
 2. Bundesliga: 2021–22

References

External links
 Malmö FF profile 
 
 
 
 

1995 births
Living people
Footballers from Bergen
Association football defenders
Norwegian footballers
SK Brann players
Malmö FF players
AC Sparta Prague players
FC Schalke 04 players
Eliteserien players
Allsvenskan players
2. Bundesliga players
Norway youth international footballers
Norway under-21 international footballers
Norway international footballers
Norwegian expatriate footballers
Norwegian expatriate sportspeople in Sweden
Expatriate footballers in Sweden
Norwegian expatriate sportspeople in the Czech Republic
Expatriate footballers in the Czech Republic
Norwegian expatriate sportspeople in Germany
Expatriate footballers in Germany
Lillestrøm SK players